Macrobathra proxena is a moth in the family Cosmopterigidae. It was described by Edward Meyrick in 1914. It is found in Malawi.

References

Endemic fauna of Malawi
Macrobathra
Moths described in 1914